The following list shows NCAA Division I FBS/I-A football programs by winning percentage during the 2000-2009 football seasons. The following list reflects the records according to the NCAA. This list takes into account results modified later due to NCAA action, such as vacated victories and forfeits. This list only takes into account games played while in Division I-A/FBS.

 

 Chart notes

 Southern California had 14 victories vacated by the NCAA during the 2004 & 2005 seasons.
 Florida State had 12 victories vacated by the NCAA during the 2006 & 2007 seasons.
 Alabama had 21 victories vacated by the NCAA between the 2005–2007 seasons.
 Florida Atlantic joined FBS in 2004.
 Western Kentucky joined FBS in 2008.
 Florida International joined FBS in 2005

See also
 NCAA Division I FBS football win–loss records
 NCAA Division I-A football win–loss records in the 1990s
 NCAA Division I FBS football win–loss records in the 2010s

References

Lists of college football team records